Statistics of Emperor's Cup in the 1990 season.

Overview
It was contested by 32 teams, and Matsushita Electric won the championship.

Results

1st round
Nissan Motors 10–0 Sapporo Mazda
Mazda 2–1 Hitachi
Toshiba 5–0 Tanabe Pharmaceuticals
Mitsubishi Chemical Kurosaki 0–2 NKK
Yamaha Motors 2–0 Tsukuba University
Cosmo Oil 0–5 Fujita Industries
Kochi University 0–2 Seino Transportation
Kyoto Sangyo University 0–4 Furukawa Electric
All Nippon Airways 3–0 NEC Yamagata
National Institute of Fitness and Sports in Kanoya 1–2 Osaka University of Health and Sport Sciences
Mitsubishi Motors 5–0 Aichi Gakuin University
Fujitsu 1–2 Honda
Yanmar Diesel 0–3 Juntendo University
YKK 2–9 Matsushita Electric
Kokushikan University 2–1 Osaka University of Commerce
Waseda University 0–3 Yomiuri

2nd round
Nissan Motors 2–1 Mazda
Toshiba 5–1 NKK
Yamaha Motors 2–0 Fujita Industries
Seino Transportation 0–4 Furukawa Electric
All Nippon Airways 3–1 Osaka University of Health and Sport Sciences
Mitsubishi Motors 0–0 (PK 5–6) Honda
Juntendo University 0–2 Matsushita Electric
Kokushikan University 1–1 (PK 4–2) Yomiuri

Quarterfinals
Nissan Motors 2–1 Toshiba
Yamaha Motors 0–1 Furukawa Electric
All Nippon Airways 1–2 Honda
Matsushita Electric 2–1 Kokushikan University

Semifinals
Nissan Motors 1–0 Furukawa Electric
Honda 1–2 Matsushita Electric

Final

Nissan Motors 0–0 (PK 3–4) Matsushita Electric
Matsushita Electric won the championship.

References
 NHK

Emperor's Cup
Emperor's Cup
1991 in Japanese football